Norbury with Roston is a civil parish in west Derbyshire incorporating the villages of Norbury and Roston.

See also
Listed buildings in Norbury and Roston

Civil parishes in Derbyshire